Giuseppe De Luca (25 December 1876 – 26 August 1950), was an Italian baritone who achieved his greatest triumphs at the Metropolitan Opera in New York City. He notably created roles in the world premieres of two operas by Giacomo Puccini: Sharpless in Madama Butterfly (at La Scala, Milan, 1904) and the title role in Gianni Schicchi (Metropolitan Opera, 1918).

Biography
De Luca was born on Christmas Day, 25 December 1876 in Rome, the son of a blacksmith. He sang in church choirs as a boy. After his voice broke, a wealthy patron paid for him to have singing lessons at the Rome Conservatory, where he studied with two top-class pedagogues, Venceslao Persichini (who also taught De Luca's fellow baritone stars Mattia Battistini and Titta Ruffo) and Antonio Cotogni. He made his operatic debut at Piacenza in 1897, singing Valentin in Gounod's Faust. His debut proved a success and he was invited to sing at a string of more important venues.

De Luca was renowned as a master of lyric, smooth-toned legato singing and his recordings confirm his excellence in this regard.  A small man, De Luca lacked a voice of huge dimensions; but his voice was immaculately used and had ample carrying power in even the largest theatres. During De Luca's best years his voice also possessed exceptional beauty of tone, in the middle register particularly.  He was a clever and versatile actor, too, and was considered to be especially memorable in ebullient comic roles.

He appeared at Italy's foremost opera house, La Scala, Milan, from 1902 to 1910, and made his London debut at the Royal Opera House, Covent Garden, in 1907. Subsequently, De Luca moved to America where he became a leading baritone at the Metropolitan Opera for 20 years, from 1915 to 1935. (He returned briefly to the Met in 1939–1940.) His first appearance at that house was on 25 November 1915, as Figaro in The Barber of Seville with Frieda Hempel as Rosina and Giacomo Damacco as Count Almaviva, with Gaetano Bavagnoli conducting.

After his retirement, he taught voice at the Juilliard School. He died at Columbus Hospital in New York City on 26 August 1950 at the age of 73.

De Luca was the grandfather of soprano Nicoletta Panni.

Legacy
De Luca is notable for creating two important Puccini roles: Sharpless in Madama Butterfly (La Scala, 1904) and the title role in Gianni Schicchi (Metropolitan Opera, 1918). He also created the Marquess in Massenet's Grisélidis, Michonnet in Cilea's Adriana Lecouvreur, Gleby in Giordano's Siberia (1903), and Sancho Panza in Massenet's Don Quichotte opposite Feodor Chaliapin.

The illustrious conductor Arturo Toscanini is reputed to have once called De Luca "absolutely the best baritone I ever heard". Certainly, he was praised by critics and audiences alike in a wide range of operatic roles, ranging from buffo and bel canto parts through to the core Verdi and Puccini characters. He even made some early forays into Wagner during his days at La Scala (Like several Italian singers of that era, he eschewed the German language, singing only in Italian and French).

De Luca's elegant vocalism is preserved on numerous recordings which he made for the Gramophone, Fonotipia and Victor companies in Italy and America from the early 1900s through to the 1920s and '30s. On some of them, he is partnered by other great singers of the Metropolitan Opera's golden age, including Enrico Caruso, Giovanni Martinelli, Beniamino Gigli, Amelita Galli-Curci, Elisabeth Rethberg, Rosa Ponselle and Ezio Pinza.  CD reissues of his recordings are widely available today. Film clips of him performing also exist.

References

Further reading

1876 births
1950 deaths
Musicians from Rome
Italian operatic baritones
Italian tenors
Juilliard School faculty
Italian emigrants to the United States
Fonotipia Records artists
Victor Records artists
20th-century Italian male opera singers
19th-century Italian male opera singers